Vestee Jackson II (born August 14, 1963) is a former professional American football cornerback in the National Football League (NFL).

Collegiate career
Vestee finished his college career with 13 interceptions from 1983–1985 at the University of Washington.

NFL career
He was drafted in the second round (55th overall) by the Bears in the 1986 NFL Draft. He played eight seasons in the NFL, mostly with the Chicago Bears (1986–1990) and the Miami Dolphins (1991–1993).

His rookie year, he had 3 interceptions and followed it up with 2 in 1987. His best season was 1988, when he led the NFC with 8 interceptions. He would follow it up with 2 in 1989 and 1 interception in 1990.

With the Miami Dolphins, he contributed 3 interceptions in 1992 but would retire after the 1993 season.

See also
 Washington Huskies football statistical leaders

References

1963 births
Living people
Sportspeople from Fresno, California
Players of American football from California
American football cornerbacks
Washington Huskies football players
Chicago Bears players
Miami Dolphins players